Balondu Bhavageethe is a 1988 Indian Kannada-language film, directed by Geethapriya and produced by Geetha Srinath and M. S. Karanth. The film stars Srinath, Anant Nag, Saritha and C. R. Simha. The film has musical score by Hamsalekha.

Cast

Srinath
Anant Nag in Special Appearance
Saritha
C. R. Simha
Ramesh Bhat
Shivaram
Shimoga Venkatesh
M. S. Karanth
Umashree
Padma Kumuta
Anitharani
Baby Rekha
Baby Sangeetha

Soundtrack
The music was composed by Hamsaleka.

References

External links
 

1988 films
1980s Kannada-language films
Films scored by Hamsalekha
Films directed by Geethapriya